Campello sul Clitunno is a comune (municipality) in the Province of Perugia in the Italian region Umbria, about 45 km southeast of Perugia.

The Temple of Clitumnus, and the source of the Clitunno River, are within its boundaries. It is also a center for olive oil production. Besides other typical central Italian foods, the local gastronomy includes crayfish and trout.

Disasters 

In November 2006, four maintenance workers were killed by a series of explosions while conducting work at an olive oil facility. The factory caught fire after the blasts. Around 500 people were evacuated as a precaution.

References

External links
 Official website

Cities and towns in Umbria
World Heritage Sites in Italy